The Puna pipit (Anthus brevirostris) is a species of bird in the family Motacillidae native to South America. It is sometimes considered a subspecies of the short-billed pipit.

References

Further reading

Anthus
Birds of South America
Birds described in 1875